Willes Little Flower School and College is one of the three first English medium school in Dhaka, Bangladesh and was established in 1956 by philanthropist Josephine Willes. The school follows the English version under Directorate of Secondary and Higher Education. The school also provides classes under Pearson Edexcel for students who will sit for A-levels. The school also has a Bangla medium sections.

History 
On 16 January 2016 parents of the students demonstrated against the school raising tuitions.

In 2017 Bangladesh Chhatra League opened a unit at the school amid criticism of the move.

On 20 January 2019, Anti-Corruption Commission led drives against school tutors providing private coaching against school regulations. Willes Little Flower School and College sent show cause notices to 30 teachers following the instruction of the commission.

On 23 August 2019, parents and teachers of Willes Little Flower School complained against the management of the school to the Prime Minister, Education Minister and the Education Board. The chairperson of the Managing Committee Arifur Rahman Titu, who is also General Secretary of Dhaka South City unit of Swechchhasebak League and his brother Ashikur Rahman Nadim, representative of parents among other management officials were accused of embezzling from the school and mismanaging it.

Location
The school is located in the Kakrail area of Dhaka city. Address is 85, Kakrail, Dhaka, 1000.

References

External links

 Willes Little Flower School (Official Website)

Schools in Dhaka District
1956 establishments in East Pakistan